D-8-XM-TV channel 8, (analog) and channel 42, (digital) otherwise known as PTV Cordillera, is a regional television station of Philippine-government owned television network People's Television Network. Its studio is located at the PTV Cordillera Broadcast Hub, PIA Cordillera Compound, Romulo Drive, Brgy. Lualhati, Baguio and its transmitter is located at Mt. Sto. Tomas, Tuba, Benguet.

History
1967 - D-8-XM-TV Channel 8 was launched by Associated Broadcasting Corporation (now TV5 Network, Inc.) until President of the Philippines Ferdinand Marcos declared Martial Law was forced to shut-down in 1972.
1973 - D-8-XM-TV Channel 8 was reopened and became part of the Banahaw Broadcasting Corporation.
1986 - PTV begin its broadcasts in Baguio after the EDSA Revolution.
July 1989 - PTV Baguio started its local operations. It was once based in an apartment in Downtown Baguio. But a year after, PTV Baguio temporarily halted its local operations and downgraded as relay station when its office got severely damaged by the 1990 Luzon earthquake.
March 26, 1992 - President Cory Aquino signed Republic Act 7306 turning PTV Network into a government corporation known formally as People's Television Network, Inc. (PTNI).
July 16, 2001 - Under the new management appointed by President Gloria Macapagal Arroyo, PTNI adopted the name National Broadcasting Network (NBN) carrying new slogan "One People. One Nation. One Vision." for a new image in line with its new programming thrusts, they continued the new name until the Aquino administration in 2010.
October 6, 2011 - People's Television Network, Inc. (PTNI) became a primary brand and the branding National Broadcasting Network was retired.
March 11, 2017 - PTV Baguio resumed its local operations and upgraded to originating station, with the inauguration of the newly constructed PTV Cordillera Broadcast Hub, which was led by President Rodrigo Duterte, PCO Sec. Martin Andanar and PTV General Manager and CEO Dino Antonio C. Apolonio. Prior to this, In March 2013, the network was ground breaking for the construction of the new PTV Cordillera Broadcast Hub. However, the construction of the PTV Cordillera Broadcast Hub was halted due to Preliminary injunction. The construction of the Broadcast hub resumed in April 2014 and the building was finished in February 2017. The President also led the ocular inspection of two newly acquired Digital Satellite News Gathering vans of the network to be used for live news coverage.
April 27, 2021 - PTV Cordillera started digital test broadcasts on UHF Channel 42.

Programming
Current
Kangrunaan a Damag 
Isyu @ Serbisyo with Eddie Carta 
Cordilleran Country: Aweng Ti Biag
Be Unrivaled with Jianlin F.
Former
PTV Cordillera Newsbreak

Digital television

Digital channels

UHF Channel 42 (641.143 MHz)

Areas of coverage

Primary areas 
 Baguio 
 Benguet
 La Union
 Pangasinan

Secondary areas 
 Portion of Nueva Ecija
 Portion of Tarlac
 Portion of Ilocos Sur

See also
People's Television Network
List of People's Television Network stations and channels
DWGT-TV - the network's flagship station in Manila.
DZEQ

References

People's Television Network
People's Television Network stations
Television channels and stations established in 1986
Television stations in Baguio
Digital television stations in the Philippines